EXTRA ("Extended Range Artillery") is an artillery rocket system developed and manufactured by Israel Military Industries (IMI) and used by Israel Defense Forces, Azerbaijan and Vietnam since 2013. It has a maximum range of 150km with a 120kg unitary warhead and accuracy of 10m CEP.

The EXTRA missiles can be launched by IMI's LYNX (MRL) launcher, as well as from a variety of other available launchers.

The ship launched version is called TRIGON.

IMI developed an air launched version of the missile, originally called MARS. The air-launched version was later renamed Rampage; it was scheduled to enter series production in 2019.

See also 
LAR-160
ACCULAR
Predator Hawk
compatible or similar foreign systems
Thunderbolt-2000
M142 HIMARS
BM-30 Smerch
KN-09 (MRL)
Fajr-5

References

Rocket artillery
Surface-to-surface missiles
Guided missiles of Israel
Military equipment introduced in the 2010s